Folli is a surname and may refer to:

 Piero Folli (1881–1948), Italian antifascist parish priest
 Sebastiano Folli (1568–1621), Italian fresco painter

See also
 Folli Follie, Greek watch and jewellery company
 Association for Logic, Language and Information or FoLLI, an international learned society
 Follis (disambiguation)